Andrew James Forster  is an Irish Anglican Bishop. He is currently Serving as Bishop of Derry and Raphoe since 8 December 2019.

Forster was  educated at Queen's University, Belfast and the Church of Ireland Theological College. He was  ordained in 1992. His first post was a curacy at Willowfield. After that he was Dean of Residence at his old university then from 2002 to 2007 he was Archdeacon of Elphin and Ardagh and rector of the Drumcliff group of parishes in County Sligo. From 2007 - 2015 he had Served as rector of Drumglass. He previously served as  Archdeacon of Ardboe from  2015 to 2019 when he was ordained a bishop.

On 29 August 2019, Forster was elected as Bishop of Derry & Raphoe, following the retirement of Bishop Kenneth Good In 31 May 2019. His consecration took place on the evening of Sunday 8 December in St Patrick's Cathedral, Armagh.  He was enthroned in the two diocesan cathedrals in Derry and Raphoe at the beginning of January 2020.

Forster is married to Heather and has three children, Hannah, Patrick & Megan (in age order).

References

Living people
Archdeacons of Ardboe
Archdeacons of Elphin and Ardagh
Alumni of the Church of Ireland Theological Institute
Alumni of Queen's University Belfast
20th-century Irish Anglican priests
21st-century Irish Anglican priests
Year of birth missing (living people)

Evangelical Anglican bishops